The NFL Global Junior Championship was played during the week leading up to the Super Bowl, in the same city that is hosting the game. The first game was played in 1997, and only two teams played, Mexico and Europe. Mexico won the first and second edition, Europe won the third edition. From 2000 to 2002 four teams participated and from 2003 to 2006 five teams. The competition ended in 2007 being replaced by the IFAF Junior World Cup.

Results

Summaries

View the results of the NFL Global Junior Championship 1997 – 2007

Most championships

External links
 Global Football
 NFL Global Junior Football - From Archive.org

References

 
Recurring sporting events established in 1997
Recurring sporting events disestablished in 2007
1997 establishments in the United States
2007 disestablishments in the United States